Blood and Bullets (also known as Knell, Bloody Avenger) is a 1976 Italian poliziottesco film written and directed by Alfonso Brescia and starring Jack Palance, George Eastman and Jenny Tamburi.

Plot

Cast 
Jack Palance as Duke
George Eastman as Dan Caputo aka Knell 
 Jenny Tamburi as Susan
  Robert Giraudo as  Captain Jeffrey
 Ugo Bologna as  Mallory
 Jut Grams as Sharp 
  Nicole Barthelmy as Belle
  Renato Montalbano as Looney Toledo
  Aldo Cecconi as Agent Owen
 Nello Pazzafini as Belle's Man
 Nick Jordan as Cop at Airport

Release
Blood and Bullets premiered in Italy on December 11, 1976. It grossed a total of 253,359,230 Italian lire.

See also 
 
 List of Italian films of 1976

References

External links

Italian crime films
1976 crime films
1976 films
Poliziotteschi films
Films directed by Alfonso Brescia
Films scored by Alessandro Alessandroni